Matthew Auchinleck or Matho Auchlek was a Scottish goldsmith who worked for James VI of Scotland and Margaret Tudor.

Auchinleck, and his father "Matho Auchinlek" the elder, were put in charge of the mint by James IV and sent in their accounts in April 1507. John Auchlek, a relation, was also a goldsmith working for the court. Their business was in Stirling, and they set up a shop and workshop in Edinburgh called a "buith" in July 1503.

In 1508 Auchlek made a silver fitting for distillation equipment used by the king's alchemist Alexander Ogilvy at Stirling Castle. The piece was described in Scots as a "bos hed to ane stellatour of silvir". The alchemists had a furnace at the castle and were trying to make the fifth element known as "quinta essentia". Auchinleck supplied Ogilvy with materials including "burnt silver".

Auchlek routinely mended and gilded the king's silver tableware and armour, and made jugs, reliquaries, and candlesticks. He repaired the king's crown in 1503 for the royal marriage and was involved in the work of the mint.

References

Court of James IV of Scotland
People from Stirling
Scottish goldsmiths
16th-century Scottish businesspeople